Jabal Akroum is a group of Lebanese villages in the Akkar District in Akkar Governorate. The villages together have a population of about 20,000. The main village, Akroum, is the only one recognized officially as a municipality although there have been efforts by the Union of Municipalities of Jabal Akroum to change this.

Villages
 Akroum
 Basateen
 Kfartoun
 Mrah el Khaoukh
 Mwanseh
 Qenia
 Sahleh

References

Akkar divisions